Matthew William Reynolds (born December 3, 1990) is an American professional baseball infielder in the Cincinnati Reds organization. He has previously played in Major League Baseball (MLB) for the New York Mets, Washington Nationals, and Kansas City Royals.

High school and college career
Reynolds attended Bishop Kelley High School in Tulsa, Oklahoma. He played both baseball and basketball and received interest from Iowa State, Furman and Butler to play college basketball.

He decided, however, to play college baseball for the Arkansas Razorbacks at the University of Arkansas. He played for Arkansas as a third baseman from 2010 to 2012 and hit .275/.382/.413 with 11 home runs and 72 runs batted in 150 career games. After his sophomore season in 2011, he played collegiate summer baseball for the Yarmouth–Dennis Red Sox of the Cape Cod Baseball League.

Professional career

New York Mets
Reynolds was drafted by the New York Mets in the second round of the 2012 Major League Baseball draft. The Mets moved Reynolds to shortstop after he signed. He made his professional debut that season for the Savannah Sand Gnats of the A-level South Atlantic League, hitting .259 with 3 home runs in 42 games.

In 2013, Reynolds played in 117 games for the High-A Florida State League, and one game for the Double-A Binghamton Mets. He hit a disappointing .225/.300/.335 with five home runs in 436 at bats. Reynolds started the 2014 season back with Binghamton and was promoted to the Triple-A Las Vegas 51s after hitting .355 in 58 games. With the 51s, he finished 2015 batting .267/.319/.402, with 65 RBIs and 6 home runs in 115 games.

Reynolds spent the 2015 regular season in Triple-A before being called up to the Mets during the 2015 NLDS to replace the injured Rubén Tejada. In doing so, he became the first player in modern baseball history to be added to a postseason roster in the middle of a series without previous major-league experience. He also became the third player in modern baseball history to be included on a postseason roster without previous major-league experience, after Chet Trail (of the New York Yankees in the 1964 World Series (not on the active roster)) and Mark Kiger (of the Oakland Athletics in the 2006 American League Championship Series). He was dropped from the roster for the World Series, and did not appear in any games in the playoffs.

The Mets promoted Reynolds to the major leagues on May 17, 2016. He made his major league debut at third base for the Mets that night. He went 0-3 with one strikeout. On May 25, Reynolds picked up his first major league hit, a single, against Nationals' pitcher Tanner Roark. Reynolds was sent down to the 51s to make room for Wilmer Flores, who came off the disabled list. Reynolds appeared in eight games during his first big league stint. He had a .100 batting average.

Reynolds was recalled again on June 3 after David Wright was placed on the disabled list. In a June 22 game, Reynolds started and appeared in the outfield for the first time in his professional career and also hit his first Major League home run, off of reliever Joakim Soria. For 2016, he batted .225/.266/.416. 	 On December 12, 2016, he underwent a right wrist debridement at the Hospital for Special Surgery.

On March 21, 2017, he was optioned to the Mets minor league camp, but he was recalled one month later. In 2017 with the Mets, he batted .230/326/.301 in 130 plate appearances. On February 7, 2018, Reynolds was designated for assignment.

Washington Nationals
Reynolds was traded to the Washington Nationals for cash considerations on February 12, 2018. He began the season with the Class AAA Syracuse Chiefs, but the Nationals called him up to the major leagues on April 7. He appeared in 10 games and batted 1-for-12 with a walk before the Nationals optioned him back to Syracuse on April 24. He was called up again to replace Anthony Rendon who was placed on the family medical leave list. The Nationals designated Reynolds for assignment on January 13, 2019, clearing a roster spot for newly signed second baseman Brian Dozier. He was outrighted on January 18, 2019. He became a free agent following the 2019 season.

Kansas City Royals
On November 16, 2019, Reynolds signed a minor league contract with the Kansas City Royals. On September 8, 2020, Reynolds was selected to the active roster by the Royals. On September 12, Reynolds was designated for assignment. He elected free agency on October 14, 2020.

Chicago White Sox
On December 17, 2020, Reynolds signed a minor league contract with the Chicago White Sox organization.
Reynolds spent the 2021 season with the Triple-A Charlotte Knights. He played in 93 games for the Knights, hitting .269 with 5 home runs and 35 RBI's. Reynolds became a free agent following the season.

New York Mets (second stint)
On December 1, 2021, Reynolds signed a minor league contract to return to the New York Mets. On April 15, 2022 he was added to the Major League roster when two other players went on the Covid-19 injured list. On April 20, 2022 Reynolds was designated for assignment to make room for Mark Canha returning from the Covid-19 injured list.

Cincinnati Reds
On April 24, 2022, Reynolds was claimed off of waivers by the Cincinnati Reds. He appeared in 92 games for Cincinnati, hitting .246/.320/.332 with 3 home runs and 23 RBI.

On January 13, 2023, Reynolds was designated for assignment by the Reds following the signing of Luke Weaver. On January 19, Reynolds cleared waivers and was sent outright to the Triple-A Louisville Bats.

References

External links

1990 births
Living people
Sportspeople from Tulsa, Oklahoma
Baseball players from Oklahoma
Major League Baseball third basemen
Major League Baseball shortstops
New York Mets players
Washington Nationals players
Kansas City Royals players
Cincinnati Reds players
Arkansas Razorbacks baseball players
Yarmouth–Dennis Red Sox players
Savannah Sand Gnats players
St. Lucie Mets players
Binghamton Mets players
Las Vegas 51s players
Scottsdale Scorpions players
Syracuse Chiefs players
Fresno Grizzlies players
Charlotte Knights players
St. Cloud River Bats players